Cobham may refer to:

Places
 Cobham, Kent, England
 Cobham, Surrey, England
 Cobham, South Australia, a former town in Australia
 Cobham, Albemarle County, Virginia, United States
 Cobham, Surry County, Virginia, United States

Aviation 
 Cobham (company), a British aerospace manufacturing company
 Cobham Aviation Services (disambiguation), an Australian airline

People 
 Cobham (surname)
 Baron Cobham
 Viscount Cobham

Other 
 Cobham Intermediate School, Burnside, New Zealand
 Cobham Oval, a cricket pitch in Whangarei, New Zealand
 Cobham Training Centre, Academy of London-based Chelsea Football Club
 Cobham's Cubs, a political faction in the eighteenth century

See also 
 Chobham (disambiguation)